Rawan may refer to:

 Rawan, Iran, a village in Iran
 Rawan, Bhulath, a village in India
 Rawan Barzani (born 1981), Kurdish politician

See also 
 Rowan (disambiguation)
 Ravan (disambiguation)